NLRB v. SW General, Inc., 580 U.S. ___ (2017), was a case in which the Supreme Court of the United States held that a person who has been nominated by the President of the United States for a position cannot hold the same job on an acting basis while awaiting Senate confirmation.

Background
The Federal Vacancies Reform Act of 1998 requires the executive branch departments and agencies to report to Congress and Government Accountability Office information about the temporary filling of vacant executive agency positions that require presidential appointment with Senate confirmation. It also contains an exception that a nominee can serve on a temporary basis if they previously served for 90 days as a "first assistant" to the person whom they would succeed.

President Barack Obama nominated Lafe Solomon to serve as general counsel at the NLRB in January 2011, which was returned by the Senate in 2013 as it had expired, and again in May 2013. The 2013 nomination was withdrawn in August. SW General, after facing accusations by Solomon’s office of unfair labor practices, brought suit, arguing that Solomon’s service violated the law, which made the complaint void. On August 7, 2015, the United States Court of Appeals for the District of Columbia Circuit ruled in favor of the company, in which Judge Karen L. Henderson was joined by Judges Sri Srinivasan and Robert L. Wilkins.

On November 7, 2016, oral arguments were heard before the Supreme Court, where acting Solicitor General Ian Heath Gershengorn appeared for the government.

Opinion of the Court
On March 21, 2017, the Supreme Court delivered judgment in favor of the company, voting 6-2 to affirm the lower court.  Chief Justice John Roberts wrote that the exception did not cover Solomon, rejected the government's argument that a ruling against it would hamstring future presidents and call into question dozens of temporary appointments made over the years, and dismissed arguments that historical practice supported the government. Since the law was enacted in 1998, three presidents have nominated 112 people for permanent posts who also were serving as acting officials. There was never any objection from Congress.

Justice Thomas' Concurrence
Justice Clarence Thomas concurred, arguing that the Appointments Clause "likely prohibited" the appointment.

Justice Sotomayor's Dissent
Justice Sonia Sotomayor, joined by Justice Ruth Bader Ginsburg, argued that the Senate never objected over the years while more than 100 people served in an acting capacity pending their nomination for a permanent post.

References

External links
 

2017 in United States case law
Appointments Clause case law
United States separation of powers case law
United States Supreme Court cases
United States Supreme Court cases of the Roberts Court